Angula da Costa (born 17 March 1987) is a Namibian football defender with Black Africa S.C. and the Namibia national football team. He first appeared in an international match for Namibia in November 2011 and has appeared in 5 matches total for his national squad.

References

1987 births
Living people
Namibian men's footballers
Namibia international footballers
Black Africa S.C. players
People from Grootfontein
Association football defenders